Teagarden is an English surname, and may refer to:

Charlie Teagarden (1913–1984), American jazz trumpeter; brother of Jack Teagarden
Jack Teagarden (1905–1964), American jazz trombonist and singer
Norma Teagarden (1913–1996), American jazz trombonist; sister of Jack Teagarden
Taylor Teagarden (born 1983), American professional baseball player

Fictional characters
Aurora Teagarden, created by Charlaine Harris

See also
Tea garden (disambiguation)
Teegarden (surname)

English-language surnames